Rogério dos Santos (born 31 May 1962) is a Brazilian judoka. He competed in the men's half-middleweight event at the 1984 Summer Olympics.

References

1962 births
Living people
Brazilian male judoka
Olympic judoka of Brazil
Judoka at the 1984 Summer Olympics
Place of birth missing (living people)